Stužica is a uniquely preserved and undisturbed primeval beech forest of the Outer Eastern Carpathians. It is located in Slovakia and borders with Poland and Ukraine. The forest has been protected since 1908 and in 1993 the area was upgraded to a National Nature Reserve. In 2007 Stužica and several other locations in the range, including six components in Ukraine, were declared as a UNESCO World Heritage Site. Five German components were added in 2011. Together they form Primeval Beech Forests of the Carpathians and the Ancient Beech Forests of Germany WH site with outstanding universal value.

Gallery

Resources

External links
 Stužica Virgin Forest

World Heritage Sites in Slovakia
Protected areas of Slovakia
Geography of Prešov Region
Protected areas of the Eastern Carpathians
Tourist attractions in Prešov Region
Forests of Slovakia